L'arma, l'ora, il movente, internationally released as The Weapon, the Hour, the Motive, is a 1972 Italian giallo film produced, co-written and directed by Francesco Mazzei. It is the first giallo that showed a corrupt priest as victim of a crime, a plot that would become a topos of the genre. Co-plotter Marcello Aliprandi went on to create another similar film in 1982, involving murder and Catholicism, entitled The Vatican Conspiracy.

Plot
Don Giorgio (Maurizio Bonuglia), a handsome priest who teaches in a convent, has been having affairs with two different women. He decides to break off relations with both of them, and soon after he is murdered. The police suspect one of the two women of the murder, but the field is narrowed when one of the two women has her throat slashed. The police learn that a little boy (Arturo Trina) witnessed one of the killings, but they're not sure if he is reliable.

Cast 
 Renzo Montagnani: Inspector Boito
 Bedy Moratti: Orchidea
 Eva Czemerys: Giulia 
 Maurizio Bonuglia: Don Giorgio
 Arturo Trina (the little boy)
 Salvatore  Puntillo
 Claudia Gravi
 Alcira Harris

References

External links

1972 films
1970s crime thriller films
Giallo films
Films scored by Francesco De Masi
1970s Italian films